Potamonautes is a genus of African freshwater crabs in the family Potamonautidae. It is both the most widespread and most diverse genus of African freshwater crabs, including more than half the species of this continent. They are found in most freshwater habitats of the African mainland and some species are semi-terrestrial.

Species
It contains the following species:

 Potamonautes adeleae Bott, 1968
 Potamonautes alluaudi (Bouvier, 1921)
 Potamonautes aloysiisabaudiae (Nobili, 1906)
 Potamonautes amalerensis (Rathbun, 1935)
 Potamonautes antheus (Colosi, 1920)
 Potamonautes anchietae (Brito Capello, 1871)
 Potamonautes ballayi (A. Milne-Edwards, 1886)
 Potamonautes bayonianus (Brito Capello, 1864)
 Potamonautes berardi (Audouin, 1826)
 Potamonautes bipartitus (Hilgendorf, 1898)
 Potamonautes brincki (Bott, 1960)
 Potamonautes calcaratus (Gordon, 1929)
 Potamonautes clarus Gouws, Stewart & Coke, 2000
 Potamonautes depressus (Krauss, 1843)
 Potamonautes dybowskii (Rathbun, 1905)
 Potamonautes dentatus Stewart, Coke & Cook, 1995
 Potamonautes didieri (Rathbun, 1904)
 Potamonautes dubius (Brito Capello, 1864)
 Potamonautes ecorssei (Marchand, 1902)
 Potamonautes emini (Hilgendorf, 1892)
 Potamonautes gerdalensis Bott, 1955
 Potamonautes granularis Daniels, Stewart & Gibbons, 1998
 Potamonautes idjiwiensis (Chace, 1942)
 Potamonautes ignestii (Parisi, 1923)
 Potamonautes infravallatus (Hilgendorf, 1898)
 Potamonautes isimangaliso (Peer & Gouws, 2015)
 Potamonautes jeanneli (Bouvier, 1921)
 Potamonautes johnstoni (Miers, 1885)
 Potamonautes kensleyi Cumberlidge & Tavares, 2006
 Potamonautes langi (Rathbun, 1921)
Potamonautes licoensis Daniels, Bittencourt-Silva, Muianga & Bayliss, 2020
 Potamonautes lirrangensis (Rathbun, 1904)
 Potamonautes lividus Gouws, Stewart & Reavell, 2001
 Potamonautes loashiensis Bott, 1955
 Potamonautes loveni (Colosi, 1924)
 Potamonautes loveridgei (Rathbun, 1933)
 Potamonautes lueboensis (Rathbun, 1904)
 Potamonautes machadoi Bott, 1964
 Potamonautes macrobrachii Bott, 1953
 Potamonautes margaritarius (A. Milne-Edwards, 1869)
 Potamonautes montivagus (Chace, 1953)
 Potamonautes mutandensis (Chace, 1953)
 Potamonautes neumanni (Hilgendorf, 1898)
 Potamonautes niloticus (H. Milne-Edwards, 1837)
 Potamonautes obesus (A. Milne-Edwards, 1868)
 Potamonautes odhneri (Colosi, 1924)
 Potamonautes paecilei (A. Milne-Edwards, 1886)
 Potamonautes parvicorpus Daniels, Stewart & Burmeister, 2001
 Potamonautes parvispina Stewart, 1997
 Potamonautes perlatus (H. Milne-Edwards, 1837)
 Potamonautes preparvus (Rathbun, 1921)
 Potamonautes pilosus (Hilgendorf, 1898)
 Potamonautes platycentron Hilgendorf, 1897
 Potamonautes platynotus (Cunnington, 1907)
 Potamonautes punctatus Bott, 1955
 Potamonautes raybouldi Cumberlidge & Vannini, 2004
 Potamonautes reidi Cumberlidge, 1999
 Potamonautes rodolphianus (Rathbun, 1909)
 Potamonautes rothschildi (Rathbun, 1909)
 Potamonautes rukwanzi Corace, Cumberlidge & Garms, 2001
 Potamonautes schubotzi (Balss, 1914)
 Potamonautes semilunaris Bott, 1955
 Potamonautes senegalensis Bott, 1970
 Potamonautes sidneyi (Rathbun, 1904)
 Potamonautes stanleyensis (Rathbun, 1921)
 Potamonautes suprasulcatus (Hilgendorf, 1898)
 Potamonautes triangulus Bott, 1959
 Potamonautes unispinus Stewart & Cook, 1998
 Potamonautes unisulcatus (Rathbun, 1933)
 Potamonautes walderi (Colosi, 1924)
 Potamonautes warreni (Calman, 1918)
 Potamonautes xiphoidus Reed & Cumberlidge, 2006

One extant species is also known from the fossil record; P. niloticus is abundant in Miocene sediments of Lake Albert. Extinct species assigned to Potamonautes are also known from the Late Cretaceous of Niger.

Distribution
Potamonautes are restricted to Sub-Saharan Africa and the Nile Basin, with more than 30 species in East Africa (none on Madagascar, the Seychelles and other offshore African islands), more than 20 in the Congo Basin region, 20 in Southern Africa, 6 in northeast Africa and 5 in West Africa. Although the genus includes common and widespread species, others have very restricted ranges of occurrence. For example, P. dubious is found only in limited parts of the Kunene River and upper Zambezi River in Southern Africa.

References

Potamoidea
Decapod genera
Extant Late Cretaceous first appearances
Taxonomy articles created by Polbot